Yefremkino is a rural locality (a selo) and the administrative centre of Yefremkinsky Selsoviet, Karmaskalinsky District, Bashkortostan, Russia. The population was 889 as of 2010. There are 17 streets.

Geography 
Yefremkino is located 17 km south of Karmaskaly (the district's administrative centre) by road. Dmitriyevka is the nearest rural locality.

References 

Rural localities in Karmaskalinsky District